Sardar Fateh Muhammad Muhammad Hassani (Urdu: سردار فتح محمد محمد حسنی) is a Pakistani Politician and was member of Senate of Pakistan, was serving as Chairperson-Senate Committee on Ports and Shipping.

Political career
He belongs to Baluchistan province of Pakistan, and was elected to the Senate of Pakistan in March 2012 on a general seat as Pakistan Peoples Party candidate. He is the chairperson of Senate Committee on Ports and Shipping and member of senate committees of Interior and Narcotics Control, Finance, Revenue, Economic Affairs, Statistics and Privatization and Industries and Production. he lost election from sardar muhmmad umar gorage in 2008

See also
 List of Senators of Pakistan
 List of committees of the Senate of Pakistan

References

External links
Senate of Pakistan Official Website
Pakistan Peoples Party Official Website

Living people
Pakistani senators (14th Parliament)
Pakistan People's Party politicians
Year of birth missing (living people)